Propagermanium (INN), also known by a variety of other names including bis(2-carboxyethylgermanium) sesquioxide and 2-carboxyethylgermasesquioxane, is an organometallic compound of germanium that is sold as an alternative medicine. It is a polymeric compound with the formula ((HOOCCH2CH2Ge)2O3)n.

The compound was first synthesized in 1967 at the Asai Germanium Research Institute in Japan. It is a water-soluble organogermanium compound used as raw material in health foods. The compound displays low toxicity in studies with rats.

References

Organogermanium compounds
Germanium(IV) compounds
Inorganic polymers
Propionic acids
Polyelectrolytes